Osman Saifullah Khan is a Pakistani politician who was a member of the Senate of Pakistan from March 2012 to March 2018.

Early life and education
Khan was born to Anwar Saifullah Khan. His grandfathe,r Ghulam Ishaq Khan, was the president in the early 1990s.

He received a master's degree in engineering, economics and management from Christ Church, Oxford, in 1995 and a degree of Master of Business Administration from the Stanford Graduate School of Business in 2009.

Political career
He was elected to the Senate of Pakistan as a candidate of the Pakistan Peoples Party in the 2012 Pakistani Senate election.

After he was named in the 2016 Panama Papers leak, it was reported that he could lose his Senate seat for not declaring his offshore companies in the details of his assets submitted to the Election Commission of Pakistan.

References

Year of birth missing (living people)
Living people
Alumni of Christ Church, Oxford
Stanford Graduate School of Business alumni
Pakistani senators (14th Parliament)
Pakistan People's Party politicians
People named in the Panama Papers
Osman